The following is a list of demons, vampires, human monsters, walking dead, ghosts, beasts and any kind of evil being or supernatural creature seen in the Buffyverse (created by Joss Whedon).

Demons, Half-Demons and Old Ones

 Acathla ("Becoming, Part Two")
 Ano-Movic Demons: The Straleys ("Bachelor Party")
 Anyanka
 Arney ("Offspring", "Lullaby")
 Artode ("Life of the Party")
 Assassin demon ("Sanctuary")
 Avilas ("Help")
 Baker ("The Ring")
 Balthazar ("Bad Girls")
 Barney the Empath Demon ("Parting Gifts")
 The Beast
 The Beast of Amalfie ("To Shanshu in L.A." and "Birthday")
 Billy Blim ("That Vision Thing", "Billy")
 Bohg'Dar Demon ("Salvage")
 Boone ("Blood Money")
 Boretz Demon ("Power Play")
 Brachen Demons ("Hero)
 Bringers
 Bro'os ("Teeth") the Loan-Shark demon ("Tabula Rasa")
 Brotherhood of Seven: Marc ("The Puppet Show")
 Senator Helen Brucker
 Cantonese Fook-Beast ("That Vision Thing")
 Carlos ("Underneath")
 Carnyss Demon ("Judgment")
 Chaos Demon ("Fool for Love")
 Champion Knight ("Judgment")
 Clem
 Codger Demon ("Heartthrob")
 Connor
 Cordelia Chase (became part-demon, never used powers for evil)
 Covenant of Trombli: Silas, Barshon
 Cyvus Vail
 Deevak ("First Impressions")
 Devlin ("Life of the Party")
 D'Hoffryn
 D'Hoffryn's acolytes in Arashmahaar ("Something Blue")
 D'Korr (D'Hoffryn's second demon hitman) ("Get It Done")
 Doc
 Doyle
 Drokken Beast ("Belonging")
 Drug Lord Demon ("The Prodigal")
 Durslar Beast ("Fredless")
 Durthok the Child-Eater ("Judgment")
 Eater Demon ("Slouching Toward Bethlehem")
 Eli ("Harm's Way")
 Eyghon the Sleepwalker ("The Dark Age")
 Ethros Demon ("I've Got You Under My Skin")
 Fell Brethren 
 Dr. Fetvanovich ("Quickening")
 Flanjoid Demon ("To Shanshu in L.A.")
 Francis ("Release")
 Frocter Demon ("Release")
 Sid & Monica Frzylcka ("Double or Nothing")
 Fungus Demon ("The Harsh Light of Day")
 Fyarl Demon ("A New Man")
 Gachnar ("Fear, Itself")
 Garwak Demon ("Provider")
 Gathwok Demons: Vakma, Trensiduf ("Over the Rainbow")
 Gavrok Spiders ("Choices")
 The Gentlemen and their Silent Footmen ("Hush")
 Ghora Demon ("Forever")
 Glarghk Guhl Kashma'nik Demon ("Normal Again")
 Glory's Minions: Jinx, Dreg, Murk, Slook, Gronx and the High Priest Minion
 Glurgg ("Apocalypse, Nowish")
 Gnarl ("Same Time, Same Place")
 Goran Demons ("The Girl in Question")
 Granok Demons ("Forgiving")
 Grappler Demons ("Quickening")
 Grimslaw Demon ("Selfless")
 The Groosalugg
 Grox'lar Beast ("Just Rewards")
 Hainsley Demon ("Just Rewards")
 Haklar Demon ("Belonging")
 Halfrek
 Hans and Gretta Straus ("Gingerbread")
 Haxil Beast ("Expecting")
 Hellhound ("The Prom")
 The Hellions: Razor, Mag, Klyed ("Bargaining", Parts One and Two)
 Hellmouth Spawn ("Prophecy Girl", "The Zeppo")
 Hindu Kush ("Judgment")
 Howler Demons ("The Ring")
 Illyria
 Intestine demon ("Lonely Hearts")
 Izzerial the Devil
 Jenoff the Soul-Sucker ("Double or Nothing")
 Jenoff's Repo-Man ("Double or Nothing")
 Princess Jheira and the Oden-Tal females ("She")
 The Judge
 Kailiff demon/Griff ("Rm w/a Vu")
 Kamal the Prio-Motu Demon ("Judgment")
 Karathmamanyugh Demon ("Spin the Bottle")
 Kathy Newman/Mok'tagar demon ("Living Conditions")
 Kek Demon ("I've Got You Under My Skin")
 Ken and the demon enslavers ("Anne")
 Der Kindestod ("Killed by Death")
 Kith'Harn Demons ("Origin")
 Kleynach Demon ("Reprise")
 Kovitch Demon ("She")
 Kulak of the Miquot Clan ("Homecoming")
 Kungai Demon ("Parting Gifts")
 Kurskov's minions ("Waiting in the Wings")
 Lachnie Hag ("Benediction")
 Lagos ("Revelations")
 Lasovic ("The Ring")
 Lei-Ach Demons ("Family")
 Lilliad Demons ("Dad")
 Lissa ("First Date")
 Lister Demons ("Hero")
 Liz ("Judgment")
 Lohesh (mentioned in "Graduation Day, Part One")
 Lorne's Id Monster ("Life of the Party")
 Lubber Demons ("Happy Anniversary")
 Lurconis ("Band Candy")
 Lurite Demon ("Heartthrob")
 Machida ("Reptile Boy")
 Madam Dorian and her Girls (Lina) ("War Zone")
 Mandraz ("Wrecked")
 M'Fashnik Demon ("Flooded")
 Mayor Richard Wilkins III aka Olvikan
 Mellish ("The Ring")
 M. James Menlo ("The Shroud of Rahmon")
 Merl
 Mofo Demon (Lenny Edward's demon muscle) ("War Zone")
 Mohra Demon ("I Will Remember You")
 Moloch the Corruptor ("I, Robot... You, Jane")
 Mordar the Bentback ("Judgment")
 Mucus Demon ("Double or Nothing")
 Multi-headed demon ("Supersymmetry")
 Mutite Demon ("Heartthrob")
 Nahdrah Demons ("Provider")
 Nezzla Demons ("Judgment")
 Norman Pfister ("What's My Line", Parts One and Two)
 Nurbatch Demon ("That Old Gang of Mine")
 Octarus (""What's My Line", Part Two)
 Olvikan ("Graduation Day, Part Two")
 Ovu Mobani ("Dead Man's Party") 
 Piasca demon ("Lonely Hearts")
 Pockla Demon ("Dead End")
 Polgara Demons ("The I in Team")
 Prechian Demon ("The Thin Dead Line")
 Preggothian Demon ("Blind Date")
 Pyleans: Lorne, Constable Narwek, Landok, Numfar, Blix, Lorne's Mother (Deathwok clan), Pylean Royal Guard: The Captain of the Guard
 Queller Demon ("Listening to Fear")
 Quor-Toth Demon ("The Price")
 Rahmon ("The Shroud of Rahmon")
 Reptilian Demon ("Parting Gifts")
 Rodentius Demon ("Fredless")
 Rwasundi Demons ("Dead Things")
 Sahjhan
 Sahrvin Demons
 Sathari ("Power Play")
 The Scourge: Trask, Tiernan ("Hero")
 Archduke Sebassis
 Sebassis' Slave/Pee-Pee Demon
 Senih'D Demon ("Couplet")
 The Senior Partners of Wolfram & Hart
 Serparvo Demon ("Something Blue")
 Shorshack Demon ("I've Got You Under My Skin")
 Sloth Demon ("Judgment")
 Sorialus the Ravager ("Waiting in the Wings")
 Shur-Hod Demons ("Heartthrob")
 Sisterhood of Jhe ("The Zeppo")
 Skench Demon ("Double or Nothing")
 Skilosh Demons ("Epiphany")
 Skip
 Skyler ("Enemies")
 Slime Demon ("The Wish" & "To Shanshu in L.A.")
 Dr. Gregson the Slod Demon ("Heartthrob")
 Sluggoth Demon ("Beneath You")
 Smile Time Puppet-Demons: Polo, Ratio Hornblower, Grrl, Rufus ("Smile Time")
 Soul-Eater ("Calvary")
 Stewart Burns ("Hell's Bells")
 Strom Demon ("Release")
 Suvolte Demon ("As You Were")
 Sweet ("Once More, With Feeling")
 Sweet's Lackeys ("Once More, With Feeling")
 Tarval Demon ("Expecting")
 Talamour/Burrower ("Lonely Hearts")
 Taparrich and the Mok'tagar demons ("Living Conditions")
 Tezcatcatl ("The Cautionary Tale of Numero Cinco")
 The Thaumogenic Demon ("After Life")
 Thesulac Demon ("Are You Now or Have You Ever Been")
 Thraxis ("Life of the Party")
 Tien Shenin ("Judgment")
 Tom Cribb ("The Ring")
 Tor ("The Trial")
 Torto Demon ("Happy Anniversary")
 Torg ("Showtime")
 Toth ("The Replacement (Buffy the Vampire Slayer)")
 Tough Guy Demon ("That Old Gang of Mine")
 Tree Demon ("Couplet")
 Turfog the Thrall Demon ("Dear Boy")
 Vahrall Demons ("Doomed")
 Vajnu Demon ("The Shroud of Rahmon")
 Val Trepkos ("The Ring")
 Vampire Detector Demons ("Blind Date")
 Vartite Monster ("Judgment")
 Vigaries ("She")
 Vinji Demons ("Harm's Way")
 Vocah, Warrior of the Underworld, Bringer of Calamity ("To Shanshu in L.A.")
 Voynok Demon ("Supersymmetry")
 Vyasa ("The Shroud of Rahmon")
 Wan-Shang Dhole ("That Vision Thing")
 Wainakay Demon ("Happy Anniversary")
 Wolfram & Hart Failsafe Technician Demon ("You're Welcome")
 Wolfram & Hart Torturer Demon ("Underneath")
 Wraithers ("Loyalty")
 Whistler
 Yeska the Davric Demon ("Guise Will Be Guise")
 The Zealots of the Devourer: The High Priest Zealot, the Keeper of the Name ("Sacrifice", "Peace Out")

Vampires

 Absalom ("When She Was Bad")
 Alonna Gunn
 Alphonse ("Doppelgangland")
 Andrew Borba ("Never Kill a Boy on the First Date")
 Andrew Hoelich ("Anne")
 Angel/Angelus
 Anne ("Lies My Parents Told Me"), Spike's mother
 Aurelius, who prophesied the coming of the Anointed One
 Big Ugly
 Billy Fordham ("Lie to Me")
 Blair ("Helpless")
 Boone ("Who Are You?")
 Charles Gunn ("After the Fall")
 Charlotte ("Sleeper")
 Collin, the Anointed One
 Dalton
 Darla
 Doug Sanders
 Dracula ("Buffy vs. Dracula")
 Drusilla
 El Eliminati ("Bad Girls")
 Elisabeth
 The Gorch family: Lyle, Tector, and Candy ("Bad Eggs", "Homecoming")
 Harmony Kendall
 Holden Webster ("Conversations with Dead People")
 James
 Jamie ("Pangs")
 Jay-Don ("The Shroud of Rahmon")
 Jeff & Mutt ("Crush")
 Jesse McNally
 Julia ("Lie to Me")
 Kakistos ("Faith, Hope & Trick")
 Stephen Korshak ("Some Assembly Required")
 Lean Boy
 Lenny ("Lovers Walk")
 Luke
 Marcus ("In the Dark") 
 The Master 
 Nightmare Buffy ("Nightmares")
 Nostroyev ("Why We Fight")
 Prince of Lies ("Why We Fight")
 Rebel Vampire Posse: Carl, Justin, Zack, Glenn, Christy, Marla and others ("All the Way")
 Richard ("Lies My Parents Told Me")
 Russel Winters ("City of")
 Sam Lawson ("Why We Fight")
 Mr. Sanderson ("Gingerbread")
 Sandy ("Doppelgangland", "Family", "Shadow")
 Sarah Holtz
 Spike
 Sunday and her gang: Dav, Rookie, Tom, Jerry and Eddie ("The Freshman")
 Theresa Klusmeyer ("Phases")
 Thomas ("Welcome to the Hellmouth")
 The Three ("Angel")
 The Three Sisters ("Buffy vs. Dracula")
 Tom ("The Harsh Light Of Day")
 Mr. Trick
 Turok-Han vampires
 Ul'thar Vampires
 Whip and the Hooker Vamps ("Into the Woods")
 Wishverse Willow ("The Wish", "Doppelgangland")
 Wishverse Xander ("The Wish")
 Zachary Kralik ("Helpless")

Wizards, witches, sorcerers and other magic users

 Madam Anita ("Couplet")
 Captain Atkinson ("The Thin Dead Line")
 Helen Bointon ("Happy Anniversary")
 Magnus Bryce ("Guise Will Be Guise")
 Jenny Calendar
 Cordelia Chase (through the former power Jasmine; notably in "Orpheus" and "Inside Out")
 Command Central witches ("The Long Way Home" onwards)
 Michael Czajak ("Gingerbread")
 The Order of Dagon ("No Place Like Home")
 The Devonshire Coven (mentioned in "Grave" and "Lessons")
 Lucien Drake ("Soul Purpose")
 Rupert Giles
 Magnus Hainsley ("Just Rewards")
 Clan Kalderash: Enyos Kalderash, Magda Kalderash (The Elder Woman)
 Kumiko ("Wolves at the Gate, Parts 1-4")
 Count Kurskov ("Waiting in the Wings")
 Paul Lanier ("Guise Will Be Guise")
 Jonathan Levinson
 Allen Lloyd ("Sense & Sensitivity")
 Tara Maclay
 Catherine Madison ("Witch")
 Amy Madison ("Witch")
 Mistress Meerna ("A New World")
 Gwendolyn Post ("Revelations")
 Rack ("Wrecked", "Seeing Red", "Two to Go")
 Ethan Rayne
 Roden ("No Future For You, Parts 1-4") 
 Marcus Roscoe ("Carpe Noctem")
 Willow Rosenberg
 Professor Oliver Seidel ("Supersymmetry")
 The Shadow-Men ("Get It Done")
 Spanky ("Conviction")
 Svear Priestesses ("Soulless")
 Thelonious ("I, Robot... You, Jane")
 Vaughne and the UC Sunnydale Wiccan Group ("The Killer in Me")
 Andrew Wells
 Wo-Pang of the Kung Sun Dai ("Awakening")
 Wesley Wyndam-Pryce

Enhanced humans

 Brain Man ("That Vision Thing")
 Vanessa Brewer ("Blind Date")
 Caleb
 Bethany Chaulk ("Untouched")
 Command Central psychics and seers ("The Long Way Home" onwards)
 Connor
 The Holy Triumvirate (The Three Blind Seer Children) ("Blind Date")
 Mayor Richard Wilkins III
 Ronald Meltzer ("I Fall to Pieces")
 Cassie Newton ("Help")
 Gwen Raiden
 Marcie Ross and other Invisible Students ("Out of Mind, Out of Sight")
 Slayers
 Wolfram & Hart's Psychics ("Blind Date", "Quickening", "Hell Bound")
 Wolfram & Hart's Telekinetic Ninja Assassin ("Quickening")

Dangerous mortals

 Hunt Acrey ("Redefinition")
 Richard Anderson ("Reptile Boy")
 Ryan Anderson ("I've Got You Under My Skin")
 Dr. Francis Angleman
 Benny, Mr. Bryce's bodyguard ("Guise Will Be Guise")
 Ilona Costa Bianchi ("The Girl in Question")
 The Biker Gang ("Dad")
 Billy's Kiddy League Coach ("Nightmares")
 Congressman Nathan Blim ("Billy")
 Brittany ("Harm's Way")
 Gib Cain ("Phases")
 Charlotte ("Harm's Way")
 Mr. Chaulk ("Untouched")
 Wilson Christopher and the Haxil's Cult Guys ("Expecting")
 Jacob Crane ("Unleashed")
 Cyril, W&H's mailboy ("Quickening")
 Danny ("Harm's Way")
 Debbie ("Salvage")
 Lee DeMarco ("The House Always Wins")
 Dick the Pimp ("Five by Five")
 Lenny Edwards ("War Zone")
 Elliot ("Ground State)
 Emil the Arms Dealer ("Lineage")
 Eric ("Some Assembly Required")
 Bret Folger ("Five by Five")
 Billy Fordham ("Lie to Me")
 Frawley ("Homecoming")
 Corbin Fries ("Conviction")
 Frederick & Hans Gruenstalher and the Old Man ("Homecoming")
 Gunn's ex-crew: Rondell, Gio ("That Old Gang of Mine")
 Hank ("Parting Gifts")
 Fritz Heinrich (SS officer) ("Why We Fight")
 Henry, Deevak's human henchman ("First Impressions")
 Captain Daniel Holtz
 Holtz's Angel-hunters: Justine Cooper, Aubrey Jenkins
 Jack the Barkeeper ("Beer Bad")
 Jackson the Drug Dealer ("The Thin Dead Line")
 Desmond Keel ("Conviction")
 Knights of Byzantium: General Gregor, Orlando, Dante ("Checkpoint", "Blood Ties", "Spiral")
 Knox
 Irv Kraigle ("Dead End")
 Lenny the Stalker ("In the Dark")
 Rebecca Lowell ("Eternity")
 The Lunch Lady ("Earshot")
 Mac ("Parting Gifts")
 Lindsey McDonald
 The Maclay Family: Mr. Maclay, Donny and Beth ("Family")
 Colonel McNamara
 MacNamara Brothers: Darin and Jack ("The Ring")
 Coach Carl Marin ("Go Fish")
 Warren Mears
 Lee Mercer
 Dr. Michaels of Fairfield Clinic ("Dead End")
 Lilah Morgan
 Takeshi Morimoto ("Players")
 Bob Munroe, Sunnydale Chief of Police
 Linwood Murrow
 Novac ("Just Rewards")
 Gavin Park
 Patrice of the Order of Teraka ("What's My Line, Part Two")
 Preston ("Home'')
 Ramone, Lanier's mole in Caritas ("Guise Will Be Guise")
 Nathan Reed ("Dead End")
 Monsigneur Rivali & the Inquisitore ("Offspring")
 Dr. Evan Royce ("Unleashed")
 Ruddy ("Harm's Way")
 Sam the Parole Officer ("Dead End")
 Lacey Shepherd ("Home")
 Fritz Siegel ("I, Robot... You, Jane")
 Oliver Simon ("Eternity")
 Rutherford Sirk ("Home")
 Dr. Sparrow
 Spencer, DeMarco's Head of Security ("The House Always Wins")
 Sunnydale cops ("Empty Places")
 The Faux T'ish Magev ("Guise Will Be Guise")
 The Trio - Warren Mears, technology expert; Andrew Wells, summoner of demons; and Jonathan Levinson, caster of spells.
 Tyke the Drug Dealer ("A New World")
 Professor Maggie Walsh
 Tom Warner ("Reptile Boy")
 Tucker Wells ("The Prom")
 Peter Wilder and the Avilas Cult ("Help")
 Wolfram & Hart Security Guards: Howard ("Blind Date"), Phillip ("Blind Date"), Allan ("Dead End"), Dwight ("Blood Money")
 Wolfram & Hart Special Ops Team: Commander Burke ("Quickening"), Agent Hauser ("Conviction"), Carlo ("Slouching Toward Bethlehem")

Undead

 Adam
 Francis Angleman ("Primeval")
 Brian ("Provider")
 Daryl Epps ("Some Assembly Required")
 Forrest Gates ("Primeval")
 The faux Ampata Gutierrez ("Inca Mummy Girl")
 Josh ("Fear, Itself")
 Holland Manners
 Lilah Morgan
 Jack O'Toole and his gang: Bob, Dickie and Parker ("The Zeppo")
 Ovu Mobani zombies ("Dead Man's Party")
 Prof. Maggie Walsh ("Primeval")
 Wolfram & Hart Zombies ("Habeas Corpses")
 Wolfram & Hart Failsafe Zombie Guards ("You're Welcome")
 23rd Precinct Zombie Cops ("The Thin Dead Line")

Ghosts and spirits 

 The First Slayer
 Hus and the Chumash Warrior Spirits ("Pangs")
 Poltergeist/Ghostly Spirits of the Orphans' Emotions ("Where the Wild Things Are")
 Grace Newman ("I Only Have Eyes for You")
 Matthias Pavayne, the Reaper ("Hell Bound")
 Pavayne's hell-sent Wolfram & Hart deceased employee apparitions ("Hell Bound")
 Dennis Pearson ("Rm w/a Vu")
 Maude Pearson ("Rm w/a Vu")
 The Puma Guide ("Intervention")
 Spirit Guides ("The Zeppo")
 James Stanley ("I Only Have Eyes for You")
 Tammy ("Birthday")
 Talisman Spectres ("Lessons")
 The Valet ("The Trial")
 Wraith ("Spin the Bottle")
 Wesley Wyndam-Pryce ("After the Fall")
 Lowell House Ghosts ("Where the Wild Things Are")

Animalistic beings

 Nina Ash
 Buffy Summers (Beer Bad)
 Peter Clarner ("Beauty and the Beasts")
 Hyena people: Xander Harris, Kyle DuFours, Rhonda Kelley, Tor Hauer, Heidi Barrie, the zookeeper ("The Pack")
 MacManus ("Unleashed")
 The Neander-Guys: Colm, Kip, Hunt & Roy ("Beer Bad")
 Oz
 Veruca

Deities and higher beings

Beljoxa's Eye ("Showtime")
The Conduit to the Powers That Be ("Birthday")
Cordelia Chase (temporarily a higher power)
Dinza, Dark Demi-Goddess of the Lost ("Ground State")
First Evil
Glorificus, a.k.a. Glory
Hecate ("Bewitched, Bothered and Bewildered")
Jasmine
The Loa Alegba ("Loyalty")
Mesekthet's replacement (the White Room's Panther) ("Home", "Hell Bound", "A Hole in the World")
Osiris ("Bargaining, Part One)
The Powers That Be
The Ra-Tet: Mesektet, Manjet, Ashet, Semkhet and Ma'at ("Long Day's Journey")

Magical creations

 Glory's Spawn of Sobek ("Shadow")
 Jonathan's Augmentation Monster ("Superstar")
 The Killer Clown ("Nightmares")
 Olaf the Troll ("Triangle")
 The Ugly Man ("Nightmares")
 Willow's Dirt Golems ("Grave")
 The Thaumogenesis Demon ("After Life")
 Roden's golems ("No Future for You")
 Dawn Summers

Monsters

 The Bezoar ("Bad Eggs")
 Bug monsters ("Fredless")
 The 'Failsafe' ("You're Welcome")
 Natalie French/the She-Mantis ("Teacher's Pet")
 The Lamprey Monster ("Doublemeat Palace")
 Quor-Toth Sluks ("The Price")
 Selminth Parasite ("Soul Purpose")
 Sunnydale High Swim Team ("Go Fish")
 Tentacle monster ("Sense & Sensitivity")

Robots

 April ("I Was Made to Love You")
 Ted Buchanon ("Ted")
 Buffybot ("Intervention", "The Gift", "Bargaining, Part One", "Bargaining, Part Two")
 Cyborg Cell ("Lineage")
 Gwen, Wolfram & Hart's Files and Records ("Dad")
 Mecha Dawn ("Wolves at the Gate")
 Moloch ("I, Robot... You, Jane")
 Warrenbot ("Villains")

Immortals and non-humans

 Drogyn the Battlebrand 
 Eve, Child of the Senior Partners
 The Guardian ("End of Days")
 Marcus Hamilton, Child of the Senior Partners
 The Immortal ("The Girl in Question")
 The Oracles ("I Will Remember You")
 The Shrouded Shaman ("Enemies")
 Transuding Furies ("That Old Gang of Mine", "Offspring")
 The Tribunal ("Judgment")
 Wolfram & Hart's Prison Wardens: Zach, Trish, Ice-cream man, Mailman ("Underneath")

Good supernatural beings

 Angel
 Buffy Summers
 Clem
 Charles Gunn ("After the Fall")
 Chinese herbalist demons ("That Vision Thing")
 Connor
 Cordelia Chase 
 Dennis Pearson ("Rm w/a Vu")
 Allen Francis Doyle
 Drogyn the Battlebrand 
 Faith
 Kendra
 Gwen Raiden
 Illyria (debatable, as she technically doesn't care about either good or evil, instead believing herself to be above everything)
 Kwaini Demon ("The Prodigal")
 Lorne
 Nina Ash
 Oz
 The Powers That Be
 Sid the Dummy
 Slayers
 Spike (though some may argue that Spike was evil, Spike earned his soul back, thus becoming good) 
 Dawn Summers
 Yarbnie demon ("That Old Gang of Mine")

Villains
Lists of film characters
Lists of minor fictional characters
Buffyverse